Takeda is a real-time tactics video game based on the life of Takeda Shingen. Takeda was developed by Magitech Corporation.

Sequels

Magitech Corporation also has produced a sequel, Takeda 2, which incorporates more aspects of the individual development of the generals, aspects such as leadership, etc.

Takeda 3 was completed in February 2009.

References

External links
Takeda - Official Takeda homepage
Magitech Corporation - Official site of Magitech Corporation
Takeda 2 - Official Takeda 2 homepage (English)
Takeda 3 - Official Takeda 3 homepage (English)

2001 video games
Windows games
Windows-only games
Real-time tactics video games
Sengoku video games
Video games developed in Canada
Japan in non-Japanese culture
Xicat Interactive games
Multiplayer and single-player video games